USS Winnemucca may refer to the following ships operated by the United States Navy:

, was a PC-461 type patrol craft launched in October 1943 and transferred to Korea, 1 November 1960
, was a Natick-class tugboat that served from December 1965 until December 2003

United States Navy ship names